Esteban Reyes Delgado (born 6 April 1937) is a Mexican former tennis player.

Reyes was the only son of tennis player turned coach Esteban Reyes Sr. His sisters, Patricia and Rosie, were also tennis players and represented Mexico at the Federation Cup. Excelling in junior tennis, Reyes was the 1952 Orange Bowl (15s) champion. In 1955 he won the US national junior championships and debuted for the Mexico Davis Cup team. He played Davis Cup until 1960, with his final appearance a default win over American Chuck McKinley.

See also
List of Mexico Davis Cup team representatives

References

External links
 
 
 

1937 births
Living people
Mexican male tennis players
Central American and Caribbean Games silver medalists for Mexico
Central American and Caribbean Games medalists in tennis
Competitors at the 1954 Central American and Caribbean Games
Tennis players at the 1955 Pan American Games
Pan American Games competitors for Mexico